The MDM MDM-1 Fox is a Polish, composite mid-wing two-seater aerobatic glider with fixed undercarriage and conventional tail unit.

This sailplane was first displayed at the World Glider Aerobatic Championships in Venlo, Netherlands, 1993, where Jerzy Makula flew it to win the World Championship. Shortly after the Championships ended, promotional flights were arranged to enable top pilots to fly this aircraft. The Fox has since had several successes at other international competitions.

Production stopped in 2005 after 36 gliders had been built; since 2011, however, production has been resumed.

Specifications

References

Glider aircraft
1990s Polish sailplanes
Aircraft first flown in 1993